Anelaphus dentatus is a species of beetle in the family Cerambycidae. It was described by Chemsak in 1962 while he was doing scientific exploration.

References

Anelaphus
Beetles described in 1962